Brijmohan Sadanah (6 October 1933 – 21 October 1990), often credited as Brij, was a veteran Indian film producer and director known for his work in Hindi cinema. He is very well known for some of the most memorable box office hit films from the 1960s to 1980s such as Do Bhai, Yeh Raat Phir Na Aaygi, Ustadon Ke Ustad, Night In London, Victoria No. 203, Chori Mera Kaam, Ek Se Badhkar Ek, Yakeen, Professor Pyarelal. His last successful film was Mardonwali Baat. He consistently chose to have Kalyanji–Anandji as the music directors of his films.

He was married to Hindi film actress, Sayeeda Khan. They had two children, daughter Namrata and son Kamal.

In the early 1980s, he suffered a major setback when some of his films turned out to be major flops at the box office like Oonche Log, Bombay 405 Miles and Magroor.  The string of flops ended with the success of Taqdeer and Mardonwali Baat.

Sadanah died on 21 October 1990 at his residence in Mumbai. While inebriated, he fatally shot himself after killing his wife and daughter, on his son Kamal Sadanah's birthday.

Filmography
Director
Mardonwali Baat (1988) 
Oonche Log (1985)
Taqdeer (1983) 
Professor Pyarelal (1981) 
Bombay 405 Miles (1980) 
Magroor (1979) 
Ek Se Badhkar Ek (1976) 
Chori Mera Kaam (1975) 
Paise Ki Gudiya (1974) 
Victoria No. 203 (1972) 
Kathputli (1971) 
Yakeen (1969) 
Do Bhai (1969) 
Night In London (1967) 
Yeh Raat Phir Na Aaygi (1966) 
Afsana (1966) 
Ustadon Ke Ustad (1963)
Tu Nahin Aur Sahi (1960) 
Nai Raahen (1959)
Bhule Bhatke (1956)

Producer
Mardonwali Baat (1988) 
Taqdeer (1983) 
Bombay 405 Miles (1980) 
Ek Se Badhkar Ek (1976) 
Victoria No. 203 (1972) 
Kathputli (1971)
Do Bhai (1969)
Ustadon Ke Ustad (1963)

References

External links
 

1990 deaths
1933 births
20th-century Indian film directors
Indian film producers
Hindi-language film directors
Hindi film producers
Film directors from Mumbai
Film producers from Mumbai
People from Gujranwala
Murder–suicides in Asia
Suicides by firearm in India
Artists who committed suicide
1990 suicides